The 'Old Spanish Treasure Cave' is located on Hwy 59 between Sulphur Springs and Gravette, Arkansas in the northwest corner of the state.

Legend
Over 350 years ago, Spanish Conquistadors traveled north through the wilderness to find the Seven Cities of Cibola, a treasure of gold. Though Coronado went back to Mexico empty-handed, it is believed that some of the Spaniards found treasure, and hid it in the cave before Indians killed them.

The cave was sealed up until it was re-discovered in 1885 by an old Spaniard from Madrid. The legend apparently led him to two maps: one on a tree, and another on a rock.  Neither these maps nor the treasure, estimated today at 40 million dollars, have ever been found.  There have been other intriguing things found in the area, such as helmets, pieces of armor, and weapons from the period.  A few gold coins had also been reported.  The Spaniard did not stay long, due to ill health.

Continued search

The legend was kept alive by George Dunbar, who continued searching for the treasure for many years. He, too, had to give up the search due to ill health. The cave was finally opened to the public in the 1930s after several other failed attempts to find the treasure. The hunt still goes on today. The cave has never been fully explored, and new territories are charted every year.

The Old Spanish Treasure Cave is still open to the public, offering guided tours throughout the year. Panning for gem stones, crystals and fossils is another activity offered at this attraction. The cave stays at a constant 56 degrees year round.

Cave formation

The cave formation is known as a karst cave. This formation is still a topic of geological research.  Basically, it is formed from water containing carbon dioxide (CO2) dissolving limestone.

Unlike with salt and gypsum, water is not able to dissolve limestone without a little help from carbon dioxide. When limestone contains cracks, water oozes into the rock and starts to widen the cracks and solute caves inside the layers. Through the cooling and heating of this water, the formation of the caves are made.

External links
  Old Spanish Cave Official Website

Landforms of Benton County, Arkansas
Caves of Arkansas
Show caves in the United States
Tourist attractions in Benton County, Arkansas